= Embassy of South Sudan, Nairobi =

The Embassy of South Sudan in Nairobi is the official diplomatic mission of the government of the Republic of South Sudan in Kenya. The embassy was established in Nairobi shortly after South Sudan gained independence from Sudan in July 2011.

Simon Juach Deng is currently the head of mission of the South Sudan Embassy in Nairobi, Kenya.

== Mission ==
The South Sudan Embassy in Nairobi was established to facilitate political and bilateral engagements between the people of the Republic of South Sudan and Kenya and also maintain cordial relations between the two countries.

== Location ==
The Embassy of the Republic of South Sudan in Kenya is located on the 6th floor of Bishops Gate, Ngong Avenue, Bishop Road in Nairobi.
